James Hamilton (March 25, 1922 – January 16, 1977) was an American Negro league shortstop in the 1940s.

A native of Texarkana, Texas, Hamilton attended Bakersfield High School in Bakersfield, California. He played for the Kansas City Monarchs in 1946, posting 11 hits in 63 plate appearances over 19 recorded games. Hamilton died in Santa Clara, California in 1977 at age 54.

References

External links
 and Baseball-Reference Black Baseball Stats and Seamheads

1922 births
1977 deaths
Kansas City Monarchs players
Baseball shortstops
Baseball players from Texas
People from Texarkana, Texas
20th-century African-American sportspeople